Self-defeating may refer to:

Self-defeating personality disorder 
Self-defeating prophecy
Self-refuting idea